Lakigecko aaronbaueri is a species in the family Gekkonidae, endemic to Iran. It is monotypic in the genus Lakigecko.

Lakigecko aaronbaueri is named after American herpetologist .

References

Gekkonidae
Monotypic lizard genera
Reptiles of Iran
Endemic fauna of Iran
Taxa named by Farhang Torki